The name NASCAR Grand National Series refers to former names of the following NASCAR series:

National-level stock car series:
NASCAR Cup Series (known as NASCAR Grand National Series between 1950 to 1970, then the NASCAR Winston Cup Grand National Series between 1971 to 1986)
NASCAR Xfinity Series (known as NASCAR Busch Grand National Series between 1986 to 2003)
Regional-level stock car series (termed as Grand National Division by NASCAR):
ARCA Menards Series East (known as NASCAR Busch Grand National North Series between 1987 to 1993; later formally known as NASCAR Grand National Division East Series)
ARCA Menards Series West (known as NASCAR Busch Grand National West in 1970; later formally known as NASCAR Grand National Division West Series)
NASCAR Grand National East Series (held in 1972 and 1973)